Dario Carlo Altieri, M.D., is an American physician and scientist working as director of the National Cancer Institute-designated Ellen and Ronald Caplan Cancer Center at The Wistar Institute in Philadelphia. Since 2015, he has served as the President and Chief Executive Officer (CEO) of The Wistar Institute. In addition, he co-founded the Cancer Biology Training Consortium and the Pancreatic Cancer alliance in 2005.

Trained in internal medicine with a postgraduate specialty degree in clinical and experimental hematology, Altieri focuses on the role of mitochondria in cancer and how exploitation of multiple mitochondrial functions enables tumor cell proliferation, evasion from multiple forms of cell death, and a heightened ability to metastasize. In addition to focusing on mitochondrial exploitation in cancer, he is the discoverer of the survivin gene, a fundamental regulator of cell division and cell survival universally over-expressed in cancer and a validated therapeutic target.

The author of over 250 peer-reviewed scientific articles, and a named inventor on 13 issued patents, Altieri maintains a federally funded laboratory and is the winner of an Outstanding Investigator Award (OIA) from the National Cancer Institute in 2017.

Prior to joining Wistar, Altieri completed his academic career as a Professor with Tenure in the Department of Pathology, Boyer Center for Molecular Medicine at Yale University School of Medicine, and was founding Chair of the Department of Cancer Biology at the University of Massachusetts Medical School.

Research
His research has focused on Inhibitors of Apoptosis (IAP), a family of genes essential for proliferation and survival of cells. His work has identified survivin, one of these IAP genes, is over-produced in almost every human cancer, and his team is currently studying the biology of survivin and how it could be used to develop treatments for cancer.

Altieri has also been involved in the development of gamitrinib, a Hsp90 inhibitor that was shown to disable the activity of mitochondria in cancerous cells.

In 2013, Altieri and his team received a $1.5 million grant from the United States Department of Defense to prepare the drug for human trials.
Prior to joining Wistar, Altieri was the founding chair of the Department of Cancer Biology at the University of Massachusetts Medical School. He also co-founded the Cancer Biology Training Consortium and the Pancreatic Cancer alliance in 2005.

Select publications 
 
 
 
 
 
 
 
 
 Chae, Y. C., Angelin, A., Lisanti, S., Kossenkow, A. A., Speicher, K. D., Wang, H., Powers, J. F., Tischler, A. S., Pacak, K., Fliedner, S., Michalek, R. D., Karoly, E. D., Wallace, D. C., Languino, L. R., Speicher, D. W. and Altieri, D. C. (2013) Landscape of the mitochondrial Hsp90 metabolome in tumors.  Nature Commun. 4:2139.
 Caino, M. C., Chae, Y. C., Vaira, V., Ferrero, S., Nosotti, M., Martin, N. M., Weeraratna, A., O’Connell, M., Jernigan, D., Fatatis, A., Languino, L. R., Bosari, S., and Altieri, D. C. (2013) Metabolic stress regulates cytoskeletal dynamics and metastasis of cancer cells.  J. Clin. Invest. 123:2907-2920.
 Chae, Y. C., Caino, M. C., Lisanti, S., Ghosh, J. C., Dohi, T., Danial, N. N., Villanueva, J., Ferrero, S., Vaira, V., Santambrogio, L., Bosari, S., Languino, L. R., Herlyn, M., and Altieri, D. C. (2012) Control of tumor bioenergetics and survival stress signaling by mitochondrial Hsp90s.  Cancer Cell 22:331-344.
 Siegelin, M. D., Dohi, T., Raskett, C. M., Orlowsky, G. M., Powers, C. M., Gilbert, C. A., Ross, A. H., Plescia, J., and Altieri, D. C. (2011) Exploiting the mitochondrial unfolded protein response for cancer therapy in mice and human cells.  J. Clin. Invest.  121:1349-1360.
 Mehrotra, S., Languino, L. R., Raskett, C. M., Mercurio, A. M., Dohi, T., and Altieri, D. C. (2010) IAP regulation of metastasis.  Cancer Cell. 17:53-64.

Further reading 
 <

References

External links 
Dr. Altieri's homepage on The Wistar Institute's website

Year of birth missing (living people)
Living people
Italian healthcare chief executives
Cancer researchers